Bad Saulgau station is a railway station in the municipality of Bad Saulgau, located in the Sigmaringen district in Baden-Württemberg, Germany.

References

Railway stations in Baden-Württemberg
Buildings and structures in Sigmaringen (district)